Captain Samuel Bellamy ( 23 February 1689 – 26 April 1717), later known as "Black Sam" Bellamy, was an English sailor turned pirate during the early 18th century. He is best known as the wealthiest pirate in recorded history, and one of the faces of the Golden Age of Piracy. Though his known career as a pirate captain lasted little more than a year, he and his crew captured at least 53 ships.

Called "Black Sam" in Cape Cod folklore because he eschewed the fashionable powdered wig in favor of tying back his long black hair with a simple band, Bellamy became known for his mercy and generosity toward those he captured on his raids. This reputation earned him another nickname, the "Prince of Pirates". He likened himself to Robin Hood, with his crew calling themselves "Robin Hood's Men".

Bellamy was born in Devon, England, in 1689, and began sailing for the British Royal Navy as a teenager. After traveling to Cape Cod around 1715, he then went south to the Florida coast in an effort to locate a sunken treasure fleet. From there he made his way to the Bahamas, sailing under Benjamin Hornigold and his second-in-command, Edward "Blackbeard" Teach. After Hornigold and Teach were voted out of command, Bellamy took a captured vessel as his own, before capturing a state-of-the-art slave trade ship, the Whydah Gally, in the early spring of 1717. Two months later, the vessel was caught in a nor'easter storm off the coast of Massachusetts and sank, taking Bellamy and most of his crew down with it. The remains of the Whydah Gally were discovered in 1984, making it the first fully authenticated Golden Age pirate ship discovered in North America.

Early life
Bellamy was born in 1689 in the parish of Hittisleigh on Dartmoor in Devon, Kingdom of England, the youngest of six known children of Stephen and Elizabeth Bellamy. Elizabeth died soon after, and was buried on 23 February 1689, three weeks before Samuel's baptism on 18 March. The future pirate became a sailor at a young age; in his late teens, he joined the Royal Navy and fought in several battles. Though it has been speculated that he may have had a wife and child, there is no definite historical proof of this.

Bellamy traveled to Cape Cod around 1715, allegedly to seek some of his relatives there. According to an abundance of local lore on the subject, it is believed that he took up an affair with a local beauty, Goody Hallett — the "Witch of Wellfleet". Professor Elizabeth Reynard, in her 1934 book The Narrow Land, gave her the name "Maria", and though there is no evidence of her bearing that name, it has nevertheless become a popular name for her. Other modern authors have called her "Mariah" and "Mary". Her age and marital status remain subjects of much debate. Some stories depict her as a young lady between 16 and 25, while others depict her as a very old woman. In some stories, her parents liked Bellamy, but did not think a poor self-confident sailor was husband material; circumstantial evidence indicates that she may have already been married, confirming some stories that it was Bellamy's intent to seek his fortune and then return, not to marry her, but to take her away.

For whatever reason, he left Cape Cod in early 1716 with a group of men to seek the vast treasures of the 1715 Spanish Treasure Fleet, which had wrecked the previous summer in a hurricane off the east coast of Florida. Wealthy jeweler Palgraves Williams, son of Rhode Island Attorney General John Williams, joined Bellamy and funded their expedition. After Bellamy left the Cape, Hallett was found to be pregnant by Bellamy. It is said that she gave birth to a son and hid the child in a barn for warmth while she foraged for food, and when she returned she found that the child had choked to death on the straw. Some legends say that it was the barn of the notable Knowles family; others claim it was that of Justice Joseph Doane, who had banished Hallett. In either case, she was arrested for the child's murder and imprisoned in the Old Jail of Barnstable, Massachusetts (the oldest wooden jail house in the United States; said to be haunted by her). Her sentence was relatively short, but she was exiled from the town. Afterwards, she waited for Bellamy in Eastham.

Career
The treasure hunters apparently met with little success, as they soon turned to piracy in the crew of pirate captain Benjamin Hornigold, who commanded the Marianne with his first mate, Edward Teach, who would soon gain fame as the pirate "Blackbeard".

In the summer of 1716, the crew became irritated by Hornigold's unwillingness to attack ships of England, his home country. By a majority vote of the crew, Hornigold was deposed as captain of the Marianne and left the vessel with his loyal followers, including Teach. The remaining 90-man crew then elected Bellamy as captain.

Upon capturing a second ship, the Sultana, it was made into a galley, and with approval of the crew, Bellamy took it as his own and assigned his friend Palsgrave Williams as commander of the Marianne. They sailed briefly alongside Olivier Levasseur, who left early in 1717 to raid South America.

Bellamy's greatest capture came in the spring of 1717, when he spotted the Whydah Gally (pronounced ) sailing through the Windward Passage between Hispaniola and Cuba. Bellamy chased the Whydah for three days before getting close enough to fire. After a single shot, Captain Lawrence Prince surrendered the Whydah by lowering its flag. True to his reputation for generosity, Bellamy rewarded Prince's lack of resistance by trading the Sultana for the Whydah. Removing the captain's quarters and upgrading the ship to 28 guns, Bellamy turned his new flagship northwards along the eastern coast of the Carolinas and on to New England.

Captain Charles Johnson (possibly a pseudonym) wrote what became the first standard historical text on pirates, A General History of the Robberies and Murders of the Most Notorious Pyrates. That source relates the story of the Whydah overtaking a sloop commanded by Captain Beer. Bellamy had wanted to let the captain keep his ship, but his crew had just voted to burn it, and the captain of the merchant vessel had just declined an invitation to join the pirates. Bellamy is attributed with making this now-famous speech:

Johnson attributes these speeches to "Captain Bellamy" without naming Samuel Bellamy specifically; other writers like Philip Gosse attribute the speeches to Charles Bellamy, a separate pirate unrelated to Samuel Bellamy. They operated at the same time in the same areas and their exploits are often conflated.

Reputation
Captain Samuel Bellamy, now known as Black Bellamy, was well known to his contemporaries and chroniclers as a distinctive figure, a tall, strong, well-mannered and very tidy man. He liked expensive clothes, especially black coats. His favorite weapons were four duelling pistols that he always carried in his sash:

As captain, his leadership style was almost democratic. His crew was very fond of him, sometimes even referring to him as "Robin Hood of the Sea" and themselves as "Robin Hood's Men". Captain Bellamy was also a good tactician. Usually, he had two ships under his control. His flagship was powerful with many cannons and the second one was light but fast, which made a good balance. With coordinated attacks, they managed to capture ships easily without harming them.

Death 

Just two months after acquiring the Whydah, as she and the Marianne approached Cape Cod, Williams told Bellamy that he wished to visit his family in Rhode Island, and the two agreed to meet up again near Maine. Bellamy and the Whydah captured several other small vessels in the area, including the Anne Galley, to which he appointed his quartermaster Richard Noland as captain.

If Bellamy intended to revisit his lover Maria Hallett, he failed. At 15 minutes past midnight, the masts snapped and drew the heavily loaded ship into 30 feet of water, where she capsized and quickly sank, taking Bellamy and all but two of the Whydah's 146-man crew with her.

104 bodies were known to have washed ashore and were buried by the town coroner, leaving 42 bodies unaccounted for. The Mary Anne was also wrecked that night several miles south of the Whydah, leaving seven more survivors. All nine survivors from the two ships were captured and prosecuted for piracy in Boston, and six were convicted on 22 October 1717 and hanged on 15 November 1717. (King George's pardon of all pirates, issued on 5 September, supposedly arrived in Boston three weeks too late). Two were set free, the court believing their testimony that they had been forced into piracy. The last, a 16-year-old Miskito Indian from Central America, John Julian, was believed to have been sold into slavery to John Quincy, the great-grandfather of U.S. President John Quincy Adams.

Williams waited for Bellamy to rendezvous; when Bellamy never appeared, Williams realized what had happened, and sailed south to Nassau in the Marianne. Noland also searched for Bellamy off Maine; failing to find him, he took the Anne Galley south, raiding ships along the way before accepting a pardon in the Bahamas.

Legacy 

In July 1984, Bellamy became famous again when the discovery of the wreckage of his flagship Whydah was announced, and would soon become the first authenticated pirate shipwreck ever discovered in North America.  At the time of its sinking, the Whydah was the largest pirate prize ever captured, and the treasure in its hold amassed roughly 4.5 to 5 tons, including huge quantities of indigo, ivory, gold, and 20,000 to 30,000 pounds sterling, divided into 180 sacks of  each. The discovery of the wreck was made in 1982 by a diving crew led and funded by underwater explorer Barry Clifford.

In 1985, Clifford recovered the ship's bell, upon which were the words "THE WHYDAH GALLY 1716", the first incontrovertible evidence of his find. He subsequently founded The Whydah Pirate Museum on MacMillan Wharf in Provincetown, Massachusetts, dedicated to Bellamy and the Whydah. It houses many artifacts which were brought from the actual wreck, including a cannon found to be stuffed with precious stones, gold and artifacts. A portion of the some 200,000 artifacts so far recovered are currently on a six-year tour around the United States under the sponsorship of the National Geographic Society. From May 2017 through 30 July 2017, it was at the Portland Science Center in Portland, Maine.

Suspected remains of Bellamy were found near the wreck of his ship, in February 2018. The bones were near a pistol identified as his, and DNA tests were carried out with a living relative to confirm. In May 2018, tests confirmed that the bones were of an Eastern European man, though not Bellamy.

In February 2021, Clifford announced six more pirates' bones were discovered in concretements of debris, and will be tested for DNA matches once they are extracted.

In popular culture 
 In the manga One Piece, the pirate character Bellamy the Hyena is named after Samuel Bellamy.
 He appears in Assassin's Creed: Pirates as one of the most notorious and colorful pirates of the era.
 The Netflix docudrama series The Lost Pirate Kingdom features his pirate career prominently, though with some historical inaccuracies.

References

Further reading 

 
 
 
 The Way of the Pirates, "Famous Pirate: Samuel Bellamy, The Romantic Pirate"

1689 births
1716 crimes
1717 crimes
1717 deaths
17th-century English people
18th-century English people
18th-century pirates
Criminals from Devon
Deaths due to shipwreck at sea
British pirates
Accidental deaths in Massachusetts
Maritime folklore
Military personnel from Devon